Benjamin Davies was an English footballer who made 102 league appearances in goal for Port Vale between 1929 and 1933. He helped the club to win the Third Division North title in 1929–30.

Career
Davies played for Wellington St. George and Crewe Alexandra, before joining Port Vale in October 1929. He kept a clean sheet in his first game; a draw at South Shields on 2 November 1929, and won the #1 jersey off Jack Prince to become the regular keeper for the rest of the 1929–1930 Third Division North winning season. He played 28 Second Division games in the 1930–31 campaign, having been forced to share goalkeeping duties with Arthur Slater. He featured 37 times in the 1931–32 season, but lost his first team place to Scottish challengers Allan Todd and Jock Leckie at The Old Recreation Ground in August 1932. He was given a free transfer in May 1933, having been limited to 12 games in 1932–33.

Career statistics
Source:

Honours
Port Vale
Football League Third Division North: 1929–30

References

Year of birth missing
Year of death missing
Footballers from Wolverhampton
English footballers
Association football goalkeepers
Crewe Alexandra F.C. players
Port Vale F.C. players
English Football League players